Levallois may refer to:
Levallois-Perret, a commune in the northwestern suburbs of Paris, France
Nicolas-Eugène Levallois, developer of Village Levallois, now part of Levallois-Perret
Levallois technique, an archaeology term for a type of stone knapping from the Paleolithic period
Levallois SC, a football club based in Levallois-Perret
Levallois Metropolitans, a basketball club based in Levallois-Perret
Levallois Sporting Club, sport club and Olympic training center in Levallois-Perret